Morgan Berchet (born 2 March 1994) is a Grand Prix motorcycle racer from France. He races in the French Superbike Championship aboard a Yamaha YZF-R1.

Career statistics

2009- 9th, French 125cc Championship #163    Honda RS125R
2010- 5th, French 125cc Championship #163    Honda RS125R
2011-
2012- 4th, French 600 Trophy #63    Yamaha YZF-R6
2013- 1st, French 600 Trophy #63    Yamaha YZF-R6
2014- 6th, French Supersport Championship #63    Yamaha YZF-R6
2015- 8th, French Supersport Championship #63    Yamaha YZF-R6
2016- 8th, Endurance FIM World Cup #33    Kawasaki ZX-10R
2016- 16th, French Superbike Championship #33    Kawasaki ZX-10R
2017- 8th, French Superbike Championship #63    Kawasaki ZX-10R
2018- French Superbike Championship #63    Yamaha YZF-R1

By season

Races by year

References

External links
 Profile on motogp.com

1994 births
Living people
French motorcycle racers
125cc World Championship riders